is an airport in the Memanbetsu section of Ōzora, a town in Hokkaidō, Japan. The airport is close to Shiretoko National Park and consistently has over one million passengers per year.

History 
The current airfield was opened in April 1985, replacing the original Memanbetsu Airport closer to the city centre. The runway at the new airport was extended to its current length in 2000. The airport was located in the Town of Memanbetsu until 2006, when a merger consolidated Memanbetsu and the Village of Higashimokoto into the Town of Ōzora.

In 2011, the Hokkaido government announced that landing fees would be waived for international charter flights using the airport in an attempt to lure more overseas tourists to the region.

Airlines and destinations

Ground transportation

Buses

Trains
It takes 20 minutes from Airport Terminal to Nishi Memanbetsu Station.

References

External links 

 Memanbetsu Airport Guide from Japan Airlines
 
 

Airports in Hokkaido